Diego Rico Salguero (born 23 February 1993) is a Spanish professional footballer who plays as a left-back for Real Sociedad.

Club career

Zaragoza
Born in Burgos, Castile and León, Rico graduated from local Burgos CF Promesas's youth system, where he started playing as a forward in the seven-a-side variation and later winger. In June 2011, he joined Real Zaragoza and was assigned to the Juvenil squad.

Rico made his senior debut with the reserves, in 2011–12. He served mostly as a backup in his two seasons with the squad, the second ending in relegation.

In the summer of 2013, Rico was promoted to the main squad and quickly overtook the habitual starter Abraham Minero. On 10 September he played his first match as a professional, starting in a 1–0 away loss against Deportivo Alavés in the second round of the Copa del Rey. He first appeared in the league four days later, playing the full 90 minutes of a 3–0 home victory over CD Tenerife in the Segunda División.

On 19 November 2013, Rico signed a five-year contract to stay at La Romareda. He scored his first professional goal the following month, the first of a 2–1 home win against Córdoba CF.

Rico agreed to a new professional deal on 7 January 2016, becoming a full member of the first team and being assigned the  22 jersey. He finished the campaign with one goal in 39 matches, contributing to an eighth-place finish.

Leganés
On 17 August 2016, Rico joined La Liga side CD Leganés on a four-year contract for a rumoured fee of €1 million. He made his debut in the competition five days later, starting and in a 1–0 away win against RC Celta de Vigo.

Rico scored his first goal in the Spanish top flight on 11 September 2016, but in a 2–1 loss at Sporting de Gijón. The following 7 August, he agreed to an extension until 2021.

AFC Bournemouth
On 24 July 2018, Rico was transferred to AFC Bournemouth for an undisclosed fee, and signed a four-year contract. He made his debut in the Premier League on 1 September, playing the entire 2–0 away defeat against Chelsea. He struggled to regularly cement his position in the team during his first season, making just 16 total appearances in all competitions; manager Eddie Howe later commented that the player had faced some hurdles in settling into the league, with the language barrier and increased physicality of the competition being key factors in this, although he did add that "he has got the technical quality and [he] has got a lovely left foot. He’s got the ability to play in the team". 

Rico enjoyed a much more positive start to the following campaign, making 14 consecutive starts for the team, beginning with a 3–1 home win against Everton. In October 2019, he was voted Player of the Month for the previous month in a poll conducted by the club's website, playing every minute in the league and also providing two assists.

Rico scored his first goal on 4 December 2020, in a 4–0 victory over Barnsley.

Real Sociedad
On 26 July 2021, Rico returned to Spain and joined Real Sociedad, on a two-year deal for an undisclosed fee.

Style of play
Rico is praised for his dead-ball delivery and the quality of his set-pieces, and is usually assigned the role of corner and direct free kick taker on the pitch. Bournemouth teammate Callum Wilson described him as having a "wand of a left foot", and Howe commented that "someone with that strength of foot, he has real power in it, accuracy with it and it is a big asset.”

Rico is also noted as being an excellent interceptor of the ball, and a generally strong defensive fullback. Late into 2019–20, he had the most interceptions of any player in the Premier League with 66.

Career statistics

References

External links

1993 births
Living people
Sportspeople from Burgos
Spanish footballers
Footballers from Castile and León
Association football defenders
La Liga players
Segunda División players
Segunda División B players
Real Zaragoza B players
Real Zaragoza players
CD Leganés players
Real Sociedad footballers
Premier League players
English Football League players
AFC Bournemouth players
Spanish expatriate footballers
Expatriate footballers in England
Spanish expatriate sportspeople in England